Cranwich is a village and civil parish in the English county of Norfolk, about  northwest of Mundford. For the purposes of local government, it falls within the district of Breckland.

History
Cranwich's name is of Anglo-Saxon origin and derives from the Old English for "a marsh with cranes or herons". 

In the Domesday Book, Cranwich is listed as a settlement of 36 households in the hundred of Grimshoe. The village formed part of the estates of William de Warenne.

Geography
In the 2011 Census, Cranwich's population is measured as a civil parish and therefore in the same survey as Ickburgh. The combined population of Ickburgh and Cranwich in 2011 was recorded as 309 residents living in 161 households.

Cranwich is located within the constituency of South West Norfolk and is represented at Parliament by Liz Truss of the Conservative Party.

Church
Cranwich's parish church is one of Norfolk's 124 remaining Anglo-Saxon round-tower churches and is dedicated to Mary, mother of Jesus. St. Mary's was in danger of falling into disrepair in the early 2000s until a grant from English Heritage allowed parishioners to carry out repairs to the building and churchyard.

In popular culture
Cranwich is the setting for the 2009 horror-comedy film Lesbian Vampire Killers, with the village renamed Cragwich in the film.

War Memorial
The war memorial for Mundford, Lynford, West Tofts and Cranwich is located in Mundford, close to the junction between the A134 and the A1065. The memorial takes the form of a stone column topped with a metal crucifix and lists the following names for Cranwich's war dead during the First World War:
 Private Herbert Nickolls (1893-1917), 1st Battalion, Royal Norfolk Regiment
 Private Reginald T. Boldry (1891-1916), 1/4th Battalion, Royal Norfolk Regiment
 Private John V. Crook (1888-1916), 9th Battalion, Royal Norfolk Regiment
 Henry Long

Notes 

Villages in Norfolk
Civil parishes in Norfolk
Breckland District